Lisa Kirk (born Elsie Kirk, February 25, 1925 – November 11, 1990) was an American actress and singer noted for her comic talents and rich contralto (her voice was called a husky alto).

Career
Born in Brownsville, Pennsylvania, Kirk was raised in Roscoe, Pennsylvania. Her Roscoe home later became the Hotel Roscoe. Kirk enrolled as a law student at the University of Pittsburgh but abandoned her studies when she was offered a spot in the chorus line at the Versailles nightclub in Manhattan.

Kirk studied theatre at HB Studio in New York City and made her Broadway debut in Allegro in 1947. In 1948, she gained critical acclaim for her performance as Lois Lane/Bianca in Kiss Me, Kate, for which Kirk recounted learning the songs (from Cole Porter) and performing them for investors before performing them in the theatre. The reviewer for CastAlbumReviews.com wrote: "As Lois/Bianca, Lisa Kirk acts and sings her numbers impeccably; her performance of 'Why Can't You Behave?' is unsurpassed as her sultry voice pours over great lines such as, 'There I'll care for you forever / Well, at least till you dig my grave.'"

In 1950, Kirk's mother, Elsie Kirk, filed suit against her daughter for failing to abide to what she said was an agreement that the two of them share her earnings. Lisa Kirk insisted no such agreement existed.

In Mack and Mabel (1974), she played an older actress who becomes a star tap dancer, and was noted by Clive Barnes to be "particularly fine". Additional Broadway credits include Here's Love (1963), Me Jack, You Jill (closed during previews in 1976), and a 1984 revival of Noël Coward's Design for Living.

Kirk's only feature film work was done behind-the-scenes, dubbing all of Rosalind Russell's singing in Gypsy (except for ""Mr. Goldstone" and the first half of "Rose's Turn").  It was rumored that she had also dubbed Lucille Ball's singing voice in Mame, but Ball denied this on The Merv Griffin Show, saying, "She's not dubbing my voice because no one can."

Kirk was active in the early days of television, appearing in such anthology series as Studio One, where she co-starred in The Taming of the Shrew on June 5, 1950. She also appeared on Kraft Television Theatre, The Colgate Comedy Hour, and General Electric Theater. In later years she guested on Bewitched and The Courtship of Eddie's Father, as well as variety series like The Ed Sullivan Show, The Hollywood Palace, and The Dean Martin Show.

Kirk frequently appeared at the Persian Room in the Plaza Hotel. She also appeared at New York City's Rainbow and Stars nightclub. In a review of her act at Rainbow and Stars in April 1989, New York Times critic John S. Wilson wrote that Kirk's "long career has given her polish, presence and a solid foundation of songs by Rodgers and Hammerstein, Cole Porter and Jerry Herman with which she is associated. She has maintained such a trim structure that she can do justice to a song called 'Is That Really Her Figure?' And although her voice may not be as full-bodied as it once was, she has a warm, easy projection that gives sensitivity and color to her songs."

In addition to Kirk's appearances on original cast albums and compilations of Broadway performances, she recorded a number of solo recordings, including I Feel A Song Comin' On and Lisa Kirk Sings At The Plaza (1959).

Kirk may be best known for her role in the original Broadway production of Cole Porter's musical Kiss Me, Kate. Bloom and Vlastnik wrote in their book Broadway Musicals: the 101 Greatest Shows of All Time that Kirk "hit the jackpot again", introducing "Why Can't You Behave" and "Always True to You (in My Fashion)". Another popular number was the upbeat "Tom, Dick or Harry", performed with Harold Lang as Lucentio, Edwin Clay as Gremio and Charles Wood as Hortensio (suitors to Kirk's Bianca). Lewis Nichols writes: "Having startled the town last season by singing 'The Gentleman is a Dope' as though she meant it, Miss Kirk is captivating ... this year as a fully accredited hoyden with a sense of humor."

Marriage
Kirk was married to sketch artist and famed songwriter Robert Wells from 1949 until her death in 1990. They had no children. Wells co-wrote "The Christmas Song (Chestnuts Roasting on an Open Fire)" with Mel Torme.

Death
Despite having been a non-smoker, Lisa Kirk died of lung cancer at Memorial-Sloan Cancer Center in Manhattan.

Radio appearances

References

External links
 
 
Remembering Lisa Kirk

1925 births
1990 deaths
American stage actresses
American television actresses
American musical theatre actresses
American contraltos
Cabaret singers
RCA Victor artists
Deaths from lung cancer in New York (state)
Actresses from Pennsylvania
20th-century American actresses
20th-century American singers
People from Brownsville, Pennsylvania
20th-century American women singers